Urodeta tortuosa is a moth of the family Elachistidae. It is found in Cameroon.

The wingspan is about 6.1 mm. The thorax, tegula and forewing are white, irregularly dusted with brown. The hindwings and fringe are greyish. Adults have been recorded in the beginning of May.

Etymology
The species name is derived from the Latin tortuosa (meaning full of turns and windings) and refers to the spirally coiled ductus bursae.

References

Endemic fauna of Cameroon
Elachistidae
Moths described in 2011
Insects of Cameroon
Moths of Africa